Syrnola arae is a species of sea snail, a marine gastropod mollusk in the family Pyramidellidae, the pyrams and their allies.

Distribution
This species occurs in the Atlantic Ocean off Ivory Coast, West Africa.

References

External links
 To Encyclopedia of Life
 To World Register of Marine Species

Endemic fauna of Ivory Coast
Pyramidellidae
Gastropods described in 2002